Samvel Mnatsyan (5 March 1990 – 6 October 2019) was a Russian professional ice hockey defenceman. He played in the Kontinental Hockey League (KHL) for Barys Astana, HC Neftekhimik Nizhnekamsk and Admiral Vladivostok.

Playing career
Mnatsyan began his career with his hometown team Avangard Omsk, playing in their junior and secondary teams but never managed to play for the senior team. After spending a season with Omskie Yastreby of the Junior Hockey League, Mnatsyan moved to the Czech Republic and played with HC Kladno in the Czech Extraliga during the 2010–11 Czech Extraliga season. He played seven games for the team and scored no points.

He moved to Kazakhstan to join Arlan Kokshetau of the Kazakhstan Hockey Championship in 2011, and the following year, signed with Barys Astana of the Kontinental Hockey League. In 2013, Mnatsyan joined HC Neftekhimik Nizhnekamsk and stayed for two seasons alongside spells in the Supreme Hockey League for Molot-Prikamye Perm and Neftyanik Almetyevsk. On 25 June 2015, Mnatsyan signed with Admiral Vladivostok.

After three seasons with Admiral Vladivostok, Mnatsyan left following the 2017–18 campaign, signing as a free agent to a two-year contract with HC Sibir Novosibirsk on 26 May 2018. Mnatsyan however was diagnosed with cancer and ultimately never played for the team. He died of cancer on 6 October 2019.

Regular season and playoffs

References

External links

1990 births
2019 deaths
Admiral Vladivostok players
Arlan Kokshetau players
Barys Nur-Sultan players
Deaths from cancer in Russia
Rytíři Kladno players
Molot-Prikamye Perm players
HC Neftekhimik Nizhnekamsk players
Neftyanik Almetyevsk players
Nomad Astana players
Omskie Yastreby players
Place of death missing
Sportspeople from Omsk
Russian ice hockey defencemen
Russian people of Armenian descent
Ethnic Armenian sportspeople
Russian expatriate ice hockey people
Expatriate ice hockey players in the Czech Republic
Expatriate ice hockey players in Kazakhstan
Russian expatriate sportspeople in the Czech Republic
Russian expatriate sportspeople in Kazakhstan